The 2016–17 Odense Bulldogs season was the 26th season in the Danish Hockey League since the team was promoted in 1990.

There has been a lot of redeployments during the summer. Bulldogs did not extend the contract with coach Brad Gratton, and signed Frederikshavn coach Peter Johansson on a two-year contract.

Furthermore, a number of players have left the club, including stars such as Ryan McDonough, Sean Wiles and John Armstrong. However, Bulldogs has signed a lot of new players, such as the former Bulldogs-player Michael Eskesen.

Bulldogs finished as second in the regular season, for the first time since the 2011–12 season. They knocked out Rungsted 4–0 in the quarter-finals. They could not handle Gentofte in the semi-finals and lost 1–4. Then they were forced into a bronze medal-game against Frederikshavn, where they lost both games, 2–6 and 0–3.

Preseason

Schedule and results

Regular season

League table

Schedule and results

Playoffs

Bronze medal-game

Player statistics
Updated 31 March 2017

Skaters

Goaltenders

Continental Cup

Group stage
The Group D tournament was played in Odense, Denmark from 18 to 20 November 2016.

Matches

Final
Continental Cup Final tournament will be played from 13 to 15 January 2017. The host will be determined later.

Matches

References

Sport in Odense